Ratu Tanoa Visawaqa (pronounced ) (died on 8 December 1852) was a Fijian Chieftain who held the title 5th Vunivalu of Bau. With Adi Savusavu, one of his nine wives, he was the father of Ratu Seru Epenisa Cakobau, who succeeded in unifying Fiji with the help from British missionaries and the crown into forming the contemporary Fiji today.

Installation 
The son of Ratu Banuve Baleivavalagi, 3rd Vunivalu of Bau and his second wife, Roko Lewasaki. He was the father of the first acclaimed Tui Viti, Ratu Seru Epenisa Cakobau, Ratu Tanoa was installed as Vunivalu upon the death of his elder brother Ratu Naulivou Ramatenikutu, who was involved in a fierce power struggle against the Roko Tui Bau, Ratu Raiwalui, which led to his death.

The idea of a Tui Viti was conceived by the British in their effort to solidify the collateral for the payment of a debt in the burning of a US privateer at Nukulau during the reign of his son Seru.

The Wars of Bau 
The island of Bau was burned three times, before its occupancy by Nailatikau. 

As the animosity intensified, Ratu Tanoa was forced into exile, firstly on Koro Island and then in Somosomo on Taveuni, where he remained until his son, Ratu Seru Epenisa Cakobau led a his families tradition of coup in 1837, reinstalling his father as Vunivalu until his death in 1852, whereupon Cakobau inherited the title. He had 9 wives (6 of whom were strangled to death in December 1852); amongst his issue were Ratu Tubuanakoro and Ratu Seru Epenisa Cakobau.

The Burner of Boats 
It was before his exile that Tanoa was named Tanoa "Visawaqa" for his bloody campaign and slaying of the Roko Tui Bau, Ratu Raiwalui, he set fire to the War Canoes of the warriors of the Roko Tui Bau, and was thereafter called Tanoa — "Burner of boats", or figuratively, "excessive killer" — even though Ratu Naulivou sent his brother Tanoa on the mission to punish the Roko Tui Bau and his followers he did not expect the bloodbath that would follow, and Tanoa's actions greatly worried his brother.

References 

 The Majesty of Colour: A Life of Sir John Bates Thurston - Page 44, by Scarr, Deryck - 1980, reference to Tanoa Visawaqa, his exile and restoration by his son seru.
  Apologies To Thucydides: Understanding History as Culture and Vice Versa - Page 249, by Marshall David Sahlins, reference to Tanoa and how his name came about.
 Fiji Handbook of the Colony: Special Wartime Issue - Page 77, by Leonard G Usher - 1943, Original from the University of Michigan. numerous references to Ratu Tanoa along with various details of his life and conquests

External links 
 Vunivalu
 Museum of Victoria with picture of and reference to Ratu Tanoa Visawaqa

Fijian chiefs
Vunivalu of Bau
1777 births
1852 deaths
Tui Kaba
Monarchy in Fiji
People from Bau (island)
1820s in Fiji
1830s in Fiji
19th-century Oceanian people